Wilfred Ivy Johnston (July 9, 1899, in Charlotte, North Carolina – July 14, 1959, in Tyler, Texas), was a professional baseball player who played infield for the Brooklyn Robins in four games during the 1924 season. He attended college at Davidson College, North Carolina State University and the University of North Carolina.

External links

1899 births
1959 deaths
Major League Baseball infielders
Brooklyn Robins players
Baseball players from North Carolina
Davidson Wildcats baseball players
North Carolina Tar Heels baseball players
NC State Wolfpack baseball players